Elections in Kuala Lumpur have been held in the Malaysian federal territory of Kuala Lumpur since 1974 and have chosen Kuala Lumpur's elected representatives in the Dewan Rakyat.

Federal constituencies
 List of Malayan federal electoral districts (1955–1959)#Selangor
 List of former Malaysian federal electoral districts#Selangor
 List of former Malaysian federal electoral districts#Federal Territories
 List of Malaysian electoral districts#Federal Territory of Kuala Lumpur

Federal election results

1974

1978

1982

1986

1990

1995

1999

2004

2008

2013

2018

References

Elections in Malaysia